The Hypsiprymnodontidae  are a family of macropods, one of two families containing animals commonly referred to as rat-kangaroos. The single known extant genus and species in this family, the musky rat-kangaroo, Hypsiprymnodon moschatus, occurs in northern Australia. During the Pleistocene, this family included the megafauna genus Propleopus.

Classification
 Family Hypsiprymnodontidae
 Subfamily Hypsiprymnodontinae
 Genus Hypsiprymnodon
Hypsiprymnodon moschatus, musky rat-kangaroo
†Hypsiprymnodon bartholomaii 
†Hypsiprymnodon philcreaseri 
†Hypsiprymnodon dennisi 
†Hypsiprymnodon karenblackae 
 Subfamily †Propleopinae Archer and Flannery, 1985
 Genus †Ekaltadeta
†Ekaltadeta ima
†Ekaltadeta jamiemulveneyi
 Genus †Propleopus
†Propleopus oscillans
†Propleopus chillagoensis 
†Propleopus wellingtonensis  
 Genus †Jackmahoneyi
†Jackmahoneyi toxoniensis
 Genus †Brachalletes
†Brachalletes palmeri

References

Diprotodonts
Extant Chattian first appearances
Taxa named by Robert Collett
Mammal families